The Valencian Pilota Federation (in Catalan: Federació de Pilota Valenciana) is the Valencian public organization that promotes and manages the many varieties and competitions of the Valencian pilota sport. Its current president is Ramón Sedeño Clemente.

There are 2,003 licensed players and 28 teachers for the 756 students at the pilota colleges. There are 77 professional players (pilotaris) and 15 marxadors at the trinquets.

The "Federació de Pilota Valenciana" was founded on 1984, until then it was part of the "Confederación Española de Pelota", which was devoted to Basque pelota, a different handball. Its worry about the Valencian pilota was shown when the presidents of the Valencian federation were chosen at Madrid and they were unaware of this sport or whose only merit was being retired players of the Basque variety. This was the situation until a retired professional Valencian pilotari, Enrique Menéndez, got to be president but soon gave up protesting for the "ignorance" the local handball was suffering, according to him. His resignation, so, forced the raise of an independent Valencian pilota federation.

The FPV has named June 14 as "Pilota day", recalling the date playing pilota was forbidden at the streets of València in 1391.

Official competitions  
Professionals
 Escala i corda
 Trofeu Individual Bancaixa
 Circuit Bancaixa
 Raspall
 Raspall singles championship 
 Raspall team championship

International relationships 
Since 1992, the FPV is a member of the International Ball game Confederation, which organizes every year the Handball International Championships.

External links 
  

1984 establishments in Spain
Valencian pilota